Muhammad Karim may refer to:

 Mohammed Karim (1896–1972), Egyptian film director, writer, and producer
 Muhammad Karim (alpine skier) (born 1995), alpine skier from Pakistan